Kief Davidson (born May 12, 1970) is an American filmmaker who was nominated for an Academy Award for Best Documentary Short at the 2013 Academy Awards for his work on Open Heart with Cori Shepherd Stern.

Born and raised in Brooklyn, Davidson began his career as an editor of comedy and music videos. He is the founder of the film and advertising company Urban Landscapes. Davidson lives and works in Los Angeles. In particular, the 2005 released film The Devil's Miner brought him awards at various film festivals, for example at the Tribeca Film Festival in 2005 as Best New Documentary Filmmaker - Special Jury Mention.

Filmography
 1994: Blood Ties: The Life and Work of Sally Mann (Documentary short, editor)
 1998: Minor Details (Director and screenwriter)
 2000: South Park (TV series, actor, credited as Keef Davidson)
 2002: Exotic Islands (TV series, director, editor, writer and producer)
 2003: Boys Life 4: Four Play (Anthology film, editor)
 2003: Richard Pryor: I Ain't Dead Yet, #*%$#@!! (Documentary TV special, additional editor)
 2005: The Devil's Miner (Documentary, director, editor, writer and producer)
 2005: Robert Klein: The Amorous Busboy of Decatur Avenue (TV movie, editor)
 2005: Happy Days: 30th Anniversary Reunion (TV documentary, additional editor)
 2006: Independent Lens (TV documentary series, director, editor, screenwriter and producer)
 2008: Kassim the Dream (Documentary film, director, editor, screenwriter and producer)
 2010: Swamp Men (TV series, editor)
 2011: Comic-Con Episode IV: A Fan's Hope (Documentary, producer)
 2012: Emergency (Documentary short film, director, producer)
 2012: Open Heart (Documentary, director, editor and producer)
 2014: A Lego Brickumentary (Documentary, director and screenwriter)
 2015: Saving Sight (Short film, director)
 2016: The Ivory Game: The Hunt for the Hunter Begins (Documentary, director)
 2017: Bending the Arc (Documentary, director)
 2022: Meltdown: Three Mile Island (Documentary, director)

References

External links
 

Living people
American documentary filmmakers
Film directors from New York (state)
People from Brooklyn
1970 births